Reino Ilmari Honkaranta (1921–1972) was a Finnish diplomat. He received a Bachelor of Political Science degree. He served as Permanent Representative of Finland to the UN Office in Europe in Geneva from 1962 to 1965, Head of Department of the Department of Commerce of the Ministry for Foreign Affairs from 1965 to 1967 and Ambassador in Brussels and Luxembourg from 1967 to 1970 and in Norway

References 

1921 births
1972 deaths
Permanent Representatives of Finland to the United Nations
Ambassadors of Finland to Norway
Ambassadors of Finland to Belgium
Ambassadors of Finland to Luxembourg
Finnish expatriates in Switzerland